The Brownsport Group is a geologic group in Tennessee. It preserves fossils dating back to the Silurian period.

See also

 List of fossiliferous stratigraphic units in Tennessee
 Paleontology in Tennessee

References
 

Silurian geology of Tennessee